Taydakovo may refer to:
Taydakovo, Samara Oblast, a village (selo) in Samara Oblast, Russia
Taydakovo, Tula Oblast, a village in Tula Oblast, Russia